This is a list of seasons played by Brisbane Roar W.F.C, formally Queensland Roar (2008/09 season), the women's section of Australian football club Brisbane Roar F.C since its creation in 2008.

Key 
Key to league competitions:

 A-League Women − formally the W-League (2008/09−2020/21), Australia's top women's football league. The competition was established in 2008.
 AFC Women's Club Championship −  the top tier women's football club competition in the Asian Football Confederation, The competition was established in 2019.
 FIFA Women's Club World Cup (proposed) − the top tier women's football club competition.
 International Women's Club Championship (defunct) − the top tier women's football club competition at the time. The competition was established in 2012 and discontinued in 2014.

Key to colours and symbols:

Key to league record:
 Season = The year and article of the season
 Pos = Final position
 P = Games played
 W = Games won
 D = Games drawn
 L = Games lost
 F = Goals scored
 A = Goals against
 Pts = Points

Key to cup record:
 En-dash (–) = Brisbane Roar W.F.C. did not participate
 DNE = The club did not enter cup play
 QR1 = First qualification round
 QR2 = Second qualification round, etc.
 Group = Group stage
 GS2 = Second group stage
 R1 = First round
 R2 = Second round, etc.
 R16 = Round of 16
 QF = Quarter-finals
 SF = Semi-finals
 RU = Runners-up
 W = Winners

Seasons

Footnotes 

 a. Played the 2008−09 season known as Queensland Roar.
 b. Was not invited to participate in the International Women's Club Championship for the years that the competition took place (2012−2014). 
 c. The 2015−16 season top scorers were Clare Polkinghorne, Gabe Marzano, Katrina Gorry, Kirsty Yallop, Tameka Butt, Ruth Blackburn and Emily Gielnik, each with 2 goals.

References 

Brisbane Roar FC (A-League Women) seasons
B
Roar